Pervouralsk (lit. the first in the Urals) is a city in Sverdlovsk Oblast, Russia, located on the Chusovaya River (Kama's tributary)  west of Yekaterinburg, the administrative center of the oblast. Population:    122,000 (1974); 90,000 (1959); 44,000 (1939).

It was previously known as Vasilyevsko-Shaytansky (until 1920).

Geography

A monument that symbolizes the border between the continents of Europe and Asia is located two kilometers from the city.coordinate:

History
History of Pervouralsk began in 1730, when Vasily Demidov began the building of the iron-making factory. It produced pipes for more than 200 years. On December 1, 1732, the factory started operating; this date is now considered the official date of the city's foundation. The village around the factory was named Vasilyevsko-Shaytansky. In 1920, the village was renamed Pervouralsk.  After building Pervouralsky Novotrubny Works in 1933, the village was granted town status.

Administrative and municipal status
Within the framework of the administrative divisions, it is, together with twenty-nine rural localities, incorporated as the City of Pervouralsk'—an administrative unit with the status equal to that of the districts. As a municipal division, the City of Pervouralsk is incorporated as Pervouralsk Urban Okrug.

Coat of arms
The coat of arms of the city was adopted in 2002. The sable is taken from a label of Demidov's steel factory. The ring actually represents a section of a pipe. Pipes are basic production of Pervouralsk.

Economy
Pervouralsk is the second fastest-developing city in Sverdlovsk Oblast after Yekaterinburg (2005 Ural Information Bureau). The annual growth rate of industrial output remains steadily at 25-30%; the retail turnover increases 20% a year (2005 Ural Information Bureau).  This positively affects the unemployment rate, which stays at low 1.16% (2005 Ural Information Bureau), and leads to the number of vacancies to exceed the number of unemployed people.

Average monthly salary is about $300, which is a little bit lower than the average in the region, which is $350 (Local Information Centre).

The city attracts attention of large businesses—only within last years there happens merges and acquisitions with Pervourask enterprises, such as Wimm-Bill-Dann, a well known dairy company, acquiring a dairy plant in Pervouralsk and Chelyabinsk Pipe Group, the second largest in the country, acquiring Pervouralsk Novotrubny Works.

Pervouralsky Novotrubny Works
Established in 1934 on the boundary between Europe and Asia in the heart of the Ural Mountains, it has inherited the traditions and high industrial standards of Ural craftsmen, whose products have been renowned throughout Europe since 17th century.

Pervouralsky Novotrubny Works produces more than 25,000 types and sizes of pipes and specially shaped tubes from 200 carbon, alloyed and stainless steel grades according to 34 Russian and 25 foreign standards and 400 specifications.

Certification by the American Petroleum Institute and the German TUV for meeting DIN standard requirements, as well as a number of other requirements, attests to the quality of pipes produced by Pervouralsky Novotrubny Works.
L
It was acquired by Chelyabinsk Pipe Group in 2005.

JSC Pervouralsk Plant of the Tubular Building Constructions (PZTSK)
Leader in the field of metal constructing, wall and roofing panels in the Russian Federation since 1975. Also offers construction decisions and installation of buildings. PZTSK's quality management system is in accordance with the requirements of DIN EN ISO 9001:2000.

Pervouralsk Plant of Complete Metallic Construction
One of the leading enterprises in Russia in the field of designing, producing and assembling of building and light metallic construction of complete delivery. At the present moment the plant produces 1,300 tons of metallic constructions, 35,000 m2 of wall roof panels and 7,000 m2 of windows per month.

Pervouralsk City Dairy Plant LLC
The plant was put into operation in 1970; its designed capacity is 120 tons per day. Currently the plant processes up to 20 tons of milk per day and specializes in the production of natural dairy and curds products, as well as drinking yogurts under the "Snegirevo" brand. The plant employs 165 people.  It was acquired by Wimm-Bill-Dann Foods OJDS in 2006.

JSC Pervouralsk Silica Plant (JSC Dinur)
One of the biggest refractory plant, manufacturing shaped and monolithic refractories. The company is the only producer of silica bricks in Russia. The number of employees is 3,000.

The plant has its own deposit of crystalline quartzite (Karaulnaya mountain), suitable for production of high quality silica bricks, milled qurtzite.

JSC Dinur exports silica bricks for coke ovens to Algeria, Egypt, Czech, Poland etc. The company fully provides the Russian market with its products.

Education
Pervouralsk metallurgical college was founded in 1945. There are branches of the Ural State Technical University and Russian State Vocational Pedagogical University.

Sports
Uralsky Trubnik Bandy Club plays in Russian Bandy Super League. It is one of the few clubs that has bought a lot of foreign players. Their home arena has a capacity of 6000. After the indoor stadium Volga-Sport-Arena in Ulyanovsk was finished, it is the only Russian Bandy Super League venue without artificial ice. However, a decision to build an indoor bandy stadium has been taken.

There are Water Sports Palace and Ice Sports Palace, ski resorts at Pilnaya and Teplaya mountains.

Cultural life

Drama theatre 'Variant' was founded back in 1982 by amateur actors. The Innovative cultural center was founded in 2016 and where museum exhibitions and concerts take place.

Notable people
Igor Malkov, speed skater
Gennady Burbulis, politician
 Yuri Tsaler, musician
 Igor Dyatlov, who died in the Dyatlov Pass incident in 1959.

References

Notes

Sources

External links
Official website of Pervouralsk 
Unofficial website of Pervouralsk 
Photo-portal
Cultural portal
Photos
Pervouralsky Novotrubny Works

 
Yekaterinburgsky Uyezd
Monotowns in Russia